Casiopea Perfect Live II is the fourth live album and second live video released by the jazz fusion group Casiopea.
On February 25, 1987, it was released with a laser disc from laser disc Co., Ltd. 7" single record "Asian Dreamer" was distributed as the first board purchase privilege.
On July 10, 1987, it became an LP record from Alfa Records.
In 2000, it was recurred as DVD "CASIOPEA LIVE HISTORY PART-I". Finally, as a privilege picture, Issei Noro interview was added.
This is contains tour final concert at U-Port hall that was Cassiopeia’s tenth anniversary tour.

Track listing

Personnel
CASIOPEA are
Issei Noro - Electric guitar
Minoru Mukaiya - Keyboards
Tetsuo Sakurai - Electric Bass
Akira Jimbo - Drums

Additional Musicians 
Yukou Kusunoki - Vocal, Percussion

Production
Producer - Shunsuke Miyazumi
Engineer - Kohji Sugimori, Yoshizawa Norio

Release history

External links
 LaserDisc Database Casiopea: Perfect Live - Live II (1986) (SM068-3140)

LP/CD

Casiopea Perfect Live II is the fourth live album released by the jazz fusion group Casiopea in 1987. This is Casiopea's 16th overall album.

Track listing

LP

CD

Personnel
CASIOPEA are
Issei Noro - Electric guitar
Minoru Mukaiya - Keyboards
Tetsuo Sakurai - Electric Bass
Akira Jimbo - Drums

Additional Musicians 
Yukou Kusunoki - Vocal, Percussion

Production
Producer - Shunsuke Miyazumi
Engineer - Kohji Sugimori, Yoshizawa Norio

Release history

External links

References

1987 live albums
Casiopea live albums
Alfa Records live albums
Casiopea video albums
1987 video albums
Live video albums